Ruth Borgenicht is an American ceramic artist who works mainly with chain mail forms made through a series of interlocking rings.

Biography
Borgenicht (b. 1967) is the daughter of Jack Borgenicht (previously married to Grace Borgenicht Brandt). She graduated in 1991 from Rutgers University in New Brunswick, New Jersey with a bachelor's degree in Mathematics. In 2016, she received an M.F.A. from Montclair State University. She has exhibited internationally at such locations as Carouge, Switzerland, Rotterdam, Netherlands, and Chicago. She lives in Glen Ridge, New Jersey. She has two children, Marcella and Eli.

References

External links
 artist website

1967 births
Living people
American women ceramists
American ceramists
Jewish American artists
Rutgers University alumni
21st-century American women artists
21st-century ceramists
Borgenicht family
21st-century American Jews